Saci Day, in Portuguese , is a day created by a Brazilian cultural non-governmental organization named Amigos do Saci to oppose the "American-influenced" holiday of Halloween. The Day of Saci is commemorated on the same day as the American holiday, October 31st. It was designed as a celebration of Brazil's culture and folklore, but few Brazilians commemorate it, even with official support in São Paulo state and a few municipalities.

History 

Halloween celebrations in Brazil started in English schools, where it was an important celebration. The real push towards the popularization of the festivity was given by industry later. In the last week of October in Brazil, many stores are decorated with pumpkins and dark colors and adorned with Halloween products – most imported from China or Taiwan.

Trying to oppose the American influence on Brazilian culture, deemed a distraction from its rich heritage, the NGO Amigos do Saci established Saci Day. The initiative was strongly supported by artists, educators, politicians and a good portion of society, and was turned into an official date in São Paulo state (Law nº 11.669, January 13th 2004), as well as ten municipalities: São Paulo, São Luiz do Paraitinga, São José do Rio Preto, Guaratinguetá and Embu das Artes (São Paulo); Vitória (Espírito Santo); Poços de Caldas and Uberaba (Minas Gerais); and Fortaleza and Independência (Ceará).

Saci 

The Saci, also called Saci-pererê, is the best known character of Brazilian folklore. It originated as a Guaraní legend in the Jesuit reductions of southern Brazil. In some regions, the Saci appears as an evil being, in others, as a playful and graceful creature. In northern Brazil, African influence transformed the Saci into a little black boy who is always smoking a pito (a kind of pipe) and has lost one of his legs in a Capoeira fight. Europeans also contributed to the legend, so the Saci got a pileus, a little red cap used by the legendary troll (a small enchanted rebel creature native to northern Portugal, especially the region of Trás-os-Montes). Saci possesses supernatural powers and makes mischief indoors, especially at night; he is able to turn himself into wind and disguise himself inside an apparently hollow bottle – once an unknowing person opens it, he is free and able to continue his trickery.

References 

Public holidays in Brazil
Brazilian folklore
October observances